New Zealand competed at the 1976 Summer Olympics in Montreal, Quebec, Canada. The New Zealand Olympic Committee was represented by 80 athletes, 71 men and 9 women, and 29 officials. The flag bearer at the opening ceremony was wrestler David Aspin.

In protest at a tour of South Africa by the All Blacks team early in the year, Congo's official Jean Claude Ganga led a boycott of 28 African nations as the International Olympic Committee refused to bar the New Zealand team. Some of the nations (including Morocco, Cameroon and Egypt) had already participated however, as the teams only withdrew after the first day. From Southern and Central Africa, only Senegal and Ivory Coast took part. Both Iraq and Guyana also opted to join the Congolese-led boycott. For the full list of boycotting countries, see 1976 Summer Olympics#Boycotting countries

Medal tables

Athletics

Track and road

Field

Boxing

Canoeing

Cycling

Four cyclists represented New Zealand in 1976.

Road
Men's individual road race

Track
Men's individual pursuit

Diving

Equestrian

Jumping

Field hockey

Men's tournament
Team roster

Head coach
Ross Gillespie

Group B

Group B play-off

New Zealand advanced to the semi-finals, while Spain continued to the classification round for fifth to eighth places.

Semi-final

Final

Neil McLeod and Les Wilson were not awarded gold medals as they did not take the field during the tournament. The gold medal won by the New Zealand men's team in 1976 remains the only Olympic field hockey medal won by a New Zealand team.

Rowing

Men

Sailing

Shooting

Mixed 50 m rifle, prone

Mixed 50 m running target

Mixed skeet

Swimming

Weightlifting

Wrestling

Officials
 Team manager – Bill Holley
 Assistant team manager – D. M. Taylor
 Chaperone – Valerie Young
 Team doctor – Graeme Campbell
 Physiotherapist – Peter Stokes
 Attache – C. J. Adair
 Athletics
 Section manager – Dave Leech
 Coach – Arch Jelley
 Boxing section manager – Alan Scaife
 Canoeing section manager – Sandy Pigott
 Cycling
 Section manager – Neil Lyster
 Coach / mechanic – Wayne Thorpe
 Equestrian
 Section manager – Ian Nimon
 Trainer – Lockie Richards
 Groom – Karen Yorke
 Hockey
 Section manager – Tony Palmer
 Coach – Ross Gillespie
 Rowing
 Section manager – Kerry Ashby
 Coach (eight) – Rusty Robertson
 Coach / boatman – J. T. Reid
 Transport manager – Brian Heyward
 Sailing
 Section manager – Don St Clair Brown
 Meteorologist / boatman – Harry Kingham
 Shooting section manager – Ian Wright
 Swimming
 Section manager – Noel Smith
 Chief coach – Bert Cotterill
 Assistant coach – Duncan Laing
 Weightlifting section manager – Bruce Cameron
 Wrestling section manager – Keith Breeze

References

Nations at the 1976 Summer Olympics
1976 Summer Olympics
Race relations in New Zealand
Summer Olympics